The Telkom Charity Cup was a South African football (soccer) annual, one-day tournament for Premier Soccer League clubs. It was usually held in early August, as the season opening event. It was traditionally played at South Africa's premier football venue, Soccer City.

The qualifying criteria were unique: The public would vote by telephone for their favourite football team to participate.  The four clubs with the most votes qualified for the tournament. The aim of the tournament was to raise money for charity through the votes and gate fees.

The four clubs selected to participate are drawn into two semi-finals, played one after the other. The two winning clubs then play in a final, later that evening.

The most successful coach in the competition has been Ted Dumitru, who recorded four wins.

In April 2011, the PSL announced that the tournament would be removed from the football calendar. Irvin Khoza, the PSL Chairman said the competition had "outlived its usefulness".

Winners

Source:

References

External links
Charity Cup Official Website
Telkom Official Website
Premier Soccer League
South African Football Association
Confederation of African Football
RSSSF competition history

Defunct soccer cup competitions in South Africa